In this Spanish name, the first or paternal surname is Keefe and the second or maternal family name is Navarro.

Sonya Camila Keefe Navarro (born April 11, 2003) is a Chilean footballer and futsal player who plays as a forward for Spanish side  and the Chile national team.

Club career 
Keefe started her career in Boston College. She played for Unión Española in 2019. However, the Primera B league was suspended due to the COVID-19 pandemic. In 2021, Keefe joined Universidad de Chile. In her debut against Deportes Antofagasta, Keefe scored two goals.

In 2023, she moved to Spain and joined  in the second division.

International career

Youth teams 
Keefe played in Chile's Under-17 national team, and scored a goal against Thailand in a tournament.

In 2018, Keefe represented Chile's Under-20 futsal team in the 2018 Summer Youth Olympics.

Senior teams 
Keefe was first called to the Chile women's national team in 2020 for the friendly games against Zambia, but she did not play. In September 2021, she was called to the national team and played in a training match against Uruguay.

Keefe made her senior debut against Mexico in a friendly on 10 October 2022.

International goals
Scores and results list the Chile's goal tally first.

References 

2003 births
Living people
Footballers from Santiago
Chilean women's footballers
Chile women's international footballers
Chile women's youth international footballers
Boston College alumni
Unión Española  footballers
Universidad de Chile  footballers
Chilean expatriate women's footballers
Chilean expatriate sportspeople in Spain
Expatriate women's footballers in Spain
Women's association football forwards